Mobocertinib, sold under the brand name Exkivity, is used for the treatment of non-small cell lung cancer.

The most common side effects include diarrhea, rash, nausea, stomatitis, vomiting, decreased appetite, paronychia, fatigue, dry skin, and musculoskeletal pain.

Mobocertinib is a small molecule tyrosine kinase inhibitor. Its molecular target is epidermal growth factor receptor (EGFR) bearing mutations in the exon 20 region. Mobocertinib is an irreversible kinase inhibitor, forming a covalent bond with the cysteine 797 in the EGFR active site, leading to sustained inhibition of EGFR enzymatic activity. The irreversible binding leads to increased potency via higher affinity binding, more sustained EGFR kinase activity inhibition, and greater overall selectivity, as only a limited number of other kinases possess a cysteine in the equivalent position.

Mobocertinib was approved for medical use in the United States in September 2021. It is a first-in-class oral treatment to target EGFR Exon20 insertion mutations.

Medical uses 
Mobocertinib is indicated for adults with locally advanced or metastatic non-small cell lung cancer (NSCLC) with epidermal growth factor receptor (EGFR) exon 20 insertion mutations, as detected by an FDA-approved test, whose disease has progressed on or after platinum-based chemotherapy.

Mechanism of action 
Mobocertinib acts to inhibit EGFR exon 20 insertion mutations at a lower concentration than it does on wild-type proteins.

Pharmacokinetics 
The volume of distribution of Mobocertinib at steady state is 3,509 L.  The mean oral bioavailability of Mobocertinib is 37%.  The median Tmax is 4 hours.  The average half-life of Mobocertinib and its metabolites is 18 hours.  Mobocertinib is metabolized by CYP3A enzymes.

Warnings 
Mobocertinib may increase the chance of QTC prolongation, specifically Torsades de Pointes which can be fatal.

Adverse Effects 
More serious side effects of Mobocertinib may include agitation, bloating of the eyes, lips, feet, blurred vision, coma, decreased urine output, headache, hostility, diarrhea, depression, dizziness, fainting, lethargy, anxiety, nausea, seizures, weight gain, fatigue as well as edema.  Other side effects which may be less frequent are: chills, cough, dilated neck veins, ill-feeling and trouble with breathing.  Other notable side effects of taking Mobocertinib are: having an acidic stomach, heartburn, acidity, hair loss/thinning, bone pain, sore throat, stuffy nose, trouble swallowing, vomiting and weakness in hands and feet.

History 
Mobocertinib was studied in participants with previously treated metastatic non-small cell lung cancer with EGFR exon 20 insertions. 

The FDA granted the application for mobocertinib orphan drug designation.

References

External links 
 
 

Amides
Breakthrough therapy
CYP3A4 inducers
Dimethylamino compounds
Indoles
Isopropyl esters
Kinase inhibitors
Orphan drugs
Pyrimidines
Tertiary amines